Ramón Antonio Avilés Miranda (January 22, 1952 – January 27, 2020) was a Puerto Rican backup infielder in Major League Baseball who played for the Boston Red Sox (1977) and Philadelphia Phillies (1979–1981). He batted and threw right-handed.

In a four-season career, totalling 117 games played, Avilés posted a .268 batting average (51-for-190) with two home runs and 24 runs batted in.

Avilés is the uncle of Mike Avilés, a former major league infielder.

He managed Los Criollos de Caguas and Los Gigantes de Carolina after moving back to Puerto Rico.

Avilés died on January 27, 2020, from complications of diabetes and high blood pressure at his home in Manatí, Puerto Rico.

See also
 List of Major League Baseball players from Puerto Rico

References

External links

1952 births
2020 deaths
Boston Red Sox players
Bristol Red Sox players
Denver Bears players
Greenville Red Sox players
Major League Baseball second basemen
Major League Baseball shortstops
Major League Baseball players from Puerto Rico
Minor league baseball managers
Oklahoma City 89ers players
Pawtucket Red Sox players
People from Manatí, Puerto Rico
Philadelphia Phillies players
Portland Beavers players
Rhode Island Red Sox players
Winston-Salem Red Sox players